Manda Kanouté (born 1 January 1963) is a Malian sprinter. She competed in the women's 200 metres at the 1992 Summer Olympics.

References

External links
 

1963 births
Living people
Athletes (track and field) at the 1992 Summer Olympics
Malian female sprinters
Olympic athletes of Mali
World Athletics Championships athletes for Mali
Place of birth missing (living people)
Olympic female sprinters
21st-century Malian people